William Clifford Caton (11 September 1924 – 16 August 2011) was an English footballer who played in the Football League for Carlisle United, Chesterfield, Crewe Alexandra and Stoke City.

Army career
Caton joined the Second Field Regiment Royal Artillery during World War II and was captured and incarcerated by the Nazis in Italy. He managed to escape the prison camp by hiding in a vehicle and jumping out of it once it had left the camp.

Football career
After leaving the Army in 1947 Caton started playing football for his local side Stoke City however he was never a favourite with manager Bob McGrory being used mostly as a reserve team player and left for Bill Shankly's Carlisle United in 1949. He later went on to play for Chesterfield, Worcester City, Crewe Alexandra, Gresley Rovers and Mossley. Caton was able to throw the ball a long way similar to that of Rory Delap. He died on 16 August 2011 at the age of 86.

Career statistics
Source:

References

External links
 
 Gresley Rovers profile at Gresley F.C.

Footballers from Stoke-on-Trent
English footballers
Stoke City F.C. players
Carlisle United F.C. players
Chesterfield F.C. players
Crewe Alexandra F.C. players
English Football League players
1924 births
2011 deaths
Worcester City F.C. players
Gresley F.C. players
Mossley A.F.C. players
Association football inside forwards
British Army personnel of World War II
Royal Artillery personnel
British World War II prisoners of war
World War II prisoners of war held by Italy
English escapees
Escapees from Italian detention
Military personnel from Staffordshire